In Memory of... Celtic Frost is a Celtic Frost tribute album released in 1996, notable for its inclusion of "Babylon Fell" by Apollyon Sun, which features former Celtic Frost vocalist/guitarist Tom Gabriel Fischer. Whilst mostly a tribute to Celtic Frost, it also pays a small nod to Fischer's other former band, Hellhammer.

Track listing
"Innocence and Wrath / The Usurper" — 4:14 (Morgion)
"Procreation (of the Wicked)" — 4:16 (Enslaved)
"Dethroned Emperor" — 4:50 (Slaughter)
"Visual Aggression" — 3:59 (Mayhem)
"Morbid Tales" — 3:41 (Inner Thought)
"Return to the Eve" — 4:15 (Sadistic Intent)
"Dawn of Meggido" — 5:32 (Cianide)
"Visions of Mortality" — 5:00 (Divine Eve)
"Mesmerized" — 3:19 (Grave)
"Babylon Fell" — 5:42 (Apollyon Sun)
"Circle of the Tyrants" — 5:15 (Opeth)
"Danse Macabre / Massacra / Triumph of Death" — 21:34 (Closedown / Emperor / 13) (Hellhammer covers)

Credits
Tom Gabriel Fischer — vocals, guitars

Tribute albums
1996 albums